Zacarías López (born 30 June 1998) is a Chilean footballer who plays as a goalkeeper for Deportes La Serena.

International career
López made his debut for Chile national team on 11 December 2021 in a 1–0 win over El Salvador.

Career statistics

Club

Notes

References

External links
 
 Zacarías López at PartidosdeLaRoja.com 

1998 births
Living people
People from Arica
Chilean footballers
Chilean expatriate footballers
Chile youth international footballers
Chile international footballers
Association football goalkeepers
San Marcos de Arica footballers
Deportivo Municipal footballers
Deportes La Serena footballers
Chilean Primera División players
Primera B de Chile players
Chilean expatriate sportspeople in Peru
Expatriate footballers in Peru